Gopal H. Gaonkar (born 1936) is a professor of engineering at Florida Atlantic University, Florida. His research interest is in Helicopter dynamics,  Floquet theory and  Large-Scale and parallel computing. Gaonkar is a recipient of American Helicopter Society's Fellow Award in 2005, was the Editor-in-Chief of the Journal of the American Helicopter Society, and a member of the AHS Technical Council.

Born and raised in Hanehalli village, Gaonkar completed his high school (1955) from the A. H. School, Bankikodla. Gaonkar earned a B.E. degree (1960) in Civil Engineering from B.V.B. College of Engineering & Technology (Now known as KLE Technological University), Hubli, a M.E. degree (1963) in Civil Engineering from VJTI, Mumbai and a D.Sc. degree (1967) in Helicopter Engineering from Washington University in St. Louis. Prior to joining FAU, Gaonkar was a research professor at the University of Southern Illinois, Edwardsville and a professor of Aerospace Engineering at the Indian Institute of Science, Bangalore. During the year 2009–2010, Gaonkar was a visiting professor at Washington University in St. Louis, his alma mater.
He is married to Anasuya Gaonkar, and has two daughters. He has four grandsons and two granddaughters.

References

  The Smithsonian/NASA Astrophysics Data System
  How to Modify a Helicopter... without a Helicopter
 Listing of AHS Technical Fellow Award

Florida Atlantic University faculty
McKelvey School of Engineering alumni
1938 births
Living people
Kannada people
Academic staff of the Indian Institute of Science
American aerospace engineers
American magazine editors
Indian magazine editors
People from Uttara Kannada
Engineers from Karnataka
Indian aerospace engineers
20th-century Indian engineers